Roger Stuart Berlind (June 27, 1930December 18, 2020) was a New York City theatrical producer and board member of Lehman Brothers Holdings, Inc. and Lehman Brothers Inc. He was one of the founders of Carter, Berlind, Potoma & Weill in 1960, a company that would later through Sandy Weill become Shearson Loeb Rhoades, which was eventually sold to American Express in 1981 for approximately $930 million in stock.

Early life
Berlind was born to a Jewish family in New York City, to Mae (née Miller) and Peter Sydney Berlind, a hospital administrator. He attended Princeton University and received his bachelor's degree in English in 1954 after completing an 82-page long senior thesis titled "The Quest of the Ideal in the Plays of Yeats and Synge". Berlind was a member of the Princeton Tower Club. The crash of Eastern Air Lines Flight 66 on June 24, 1975 killed his wife, Helen Polk Clark, and three of his four children.

Theatrical career
His theatrical producing career began in 1976. Since then, he has produced or co-produced more than forty plays and musicals on Broadway and many off-Broadway and regional theatre productions as well. Berlind has won 25 Tony Awards, more than any other individual. His Broadway productions have won numerous Tony Awards. Among them are Amadeus, Nine, Long Day's Journey Into Night, Ain't Misbehavin', Guys and Dolls, Hamlet, Passion, A Funny Thing Happened on the Way to the Forum, Copenhagen, Kiss Me, Kate, Proof, the Pulitzer Prize-winning Anna in the Tropics, the 2004 revival of Wonderful Town, Curtains, and Deuce.

In 2003, the 360-seat Roger S. Berlind Theatre opened in the McCarter Theatre Center at Princeton University. Princeton's Roger S. Berlind Professorship in the Humanities, previously held by Joyce Carol Oates, is currently held by Tracy K. Smith. In 2009, he was inducted into the American Theater Hall of Fame.

See also
 Cogan, Berlind, Weill & Levitt
 Theatre
 New York City

References

External links
 
 
 Testimony of Roger S. Berlind on behalf of the League of American Theatres and Producers, Inc.
 Person Tearsheet
 Washingtonpost.com: The Ethics Squeeze

1930 births
2020 deaths
Princeton University alumni
American entertainment industry businesspeople
American theatre managers and producers
American Jews
Lehman Brothers people